The Colton Carnegie Library is a Carnegie library located at 380 North La Cadena Drive in Colton, California. The library was built in 1908 through a $10,000 grant from the Carnegie Foundation. Architect Franklin P. Burnham designed the Neoclassical building, the only example of the style in Colton. The building features an entrance portico supported by Ionic columns, a frieze and ornamented pediment above the entrance, and pilasters at the corners. In addition to housing the city's collection of over 1,000 books, the library hosted community meetings and social groups and even served as a church. The library moved to a larger building in 1982, and the building now houses the Colton Area Museum.

The building was added to the National Register of Historic Places on June 3, 1988.

References

External links
 

Libraries on the National Register of Historic Places in California
Neoclassical architecture in California
Library buildings completed in 1908
National Register of Historic Places in San Bernardino County, California
Colton, California
Museums in San Bernardino County, California
History museums in California
Carnegie libraries in California
1908 establishments in California